Michael Basil Cosmopoulos (born 1963) is Professor of Greek History and Archaeology with the Department of Anthropology and Archaeology; and Holder of the Endowed Professorship in Greek Studies at the University of Missouri–St. Louis. He is a Fellow of the St. Louis Academy of Science, a Fellow of the Royal Society of Canada, a Corresponding Member of the Athens Academy of Arts and Sciences, and a member of the European Academy of Sciences and Arts.

Early life and education

He was born in Athens in 1963 and graduated from the Anavryta Magnet High School. He studied Archaeology, Ancient History, Anthropology, and Classical Languages at the University of Athens (B.A., summa cum laude, 1981), the University of Sorbonne-Paris IV (D.E.U.G., 1983), and Washington University in St. Louis (M.A. 1986, Ph.D. 1991). He also holds a Diploma in Underwater Archaeology from the Council of Europe (1984).

University career

In 1989, at the age of 26, he was appointed Assistant Professor of Classical Studies and Anthropology at the University of Manitoba in Winnipeg, Canada, where he taught a wide range of subjects and received two teaching awards. At the University of Manitoba he founded the Center for Hellenic Civilization.
 
In August 2001 he moved to St. Louis to take up the Hellenic Government-Karakas Family Foundation Endowed Professorship of Greek Studies as Professor of History and Archaeology with the Department of Anthropology and Archaeology at the University of Missouri–St. Louis.

Archaeological work

He has excavated at various archaeological sites in Greece and Ukraine, including Mycenae, Epidavros, Ancient Corinth, Naxos, Ithaca, Oropos and Olbia (now Berezan) in the Black Sea. He is the director of Archaeological Research in Eleusis and since 1999 he directs the excavations of the Archaeological Society of Athens at Iklaina Messenia (IK.A.P.: Iklaina Archaeological Project) near Pylos. His excavations in Iklaina brought to light an important center of Mycenaean civilization with Cyclopean walls, frescoes, paved streets, and the oldest record of Linear B of Mainland Greece.

Greek Studies

Cosmopoulos has been actively involved in the dissemination of Greek Studies in North America. In Canada, in addition to the Hellenic Center at the University of Manitoba, he founded the Pan-Macedonian Association of Manitoba, and the Canadian Committee for the Restitution of the Parthenon Marbles.

In the United States, he created the University of Missouri–St. Louis Greek Studies Program, with annual enrollments of 300 students and one of the few Degrees of Greek Studies in North America. He also founded the Nicholas and Theodora Matsakis Center for Hellenic Culture. He has organized many international conferences, public lectures, and events to inform the Canadian and US public on issues of Greek culture. He has given hundreds of lectures on Greek archaeology issues in Canada, United States, Greece, Germany, and the UK.

For his research accomplishments he has been awarded the Canada Rh Award for Outstanding Contributions to Scholarship and Research in the Humanities. He has also received numerous teaching awards, including the Archaeological Institute of America Award for Excellence in Teaching.

Publications

Cosmopoulos has published 16 books and more than 100 articles and scholarly papers on the archaeology, culture, and socio-political history of ancient Greece. His books include:

 2018: Iklaina. The Monumental Buildings. .

 2016: The Political Geography of a Mycenaean District. The Archaeological Survey at Iklaina. .

2015: Bronze Age Eleusis and the Origins of the Eleusinian Mysteries. Cambridge University Press, Cambridge. .

2014: The Sanctuary of Demeter at Eleusis. The Bronze Age, Vols. I-II. Library of the Athens Archaeological Society 295–296, Athens. .

2007: Experiencing War: Trauma and Society in Ancient Greece and Today. Ares Publishers, Chicago. .

2004: The Parthenon and Its Sculptures. Cambridge University Press, Cambridge  .

2004: Η Νάξος και το Κρητομυκηναϊκό Αιγαίο. Στρωματογραφία, Κεραμική και Οικονομική Οργάνωση του Υστεροελλαδικού Οικισμού στη Γρόττα. Πανεπιστήμιο Αθηνών, Δημοσιεύματα Περιοδικού Αρχαιογνωσία, Αρ. 3 ([2]) 

2003: Greek Mysteries. The Archaeology and Ritual of Greek Secret Cults. Routledge, London and New York . Greek translation: Ελληνικά Μυστήρια. Αρχαιολογία και Τελετουργικό των Αρχαίων Ελληνικών Μυστηριακών Λατρειών, Eκδόσεις Ενάλιος, Αθήνα 2007 

2001: The Rural History of Ancient Greek City-States: the Oropos Survey Project. British Archaeological Reports-International Series 1001, Oxford 

2001–2008: Journal of Modern Hellenism (co-editor, with A. Gerolymatos, H. Psomiades, C. Ioannides)

1992: Macedonia. An Introduction to its Political History. Manitoba Studies in Classical Civilization. Winnipeg .

1991: The Early Bronze 2 in the Aegean. Studies in Mediterranean Archaeology XCVIII. Jonsered..

1984: Νεολιθική Μικρά Ασία. Αθήνα
 
1982: Αρχαικα Εργαστήρια Γλυπτικής. Η Σάμος. Αθήνα
 
1981: Υστεροελλαδικοί Θαλαμωτοί Τάφοι. Αθήνα
 
1979: Περικλής. Εκδόσεις Παπαδήμα. Αθήνα.

References

External links
 University of Missouri page
 Michael Cosmopoulos Home Page
 University of Manitoba, Winnipeg, Canada
 University of Missouri-St. Louis, USA
 Greek Professorship University of Missouri
 Archaeological Project of Iklaina, Pylos, Messinia
 Article about Naxos in the Oxford Journal of Archeology
 "The Future of the Greek Language in America" (op-ed in the Greek daily newspaper "TO BHMA" 04.11.2007)

Archaeologists from Athens
Living people
1963 births
University of Paris alumni
National and Kapodistrian University of Athens alumni
Washington University in St. Louis alumni
Greek emigrants to the United States
People from Athens
Greek expatriates in France
University of Missouri–St. Louis faculty